Magnesium nickel hydride is the chemical compound Mg2NiH4. It contains 3.6% by weight of hydrogen and has been studied as a potential hydrogen storage medium.

References

Metal hydrides
Magnesium compounds
Nickel compounds